Reha Erginer (born 1 January 1970) is a Turkish football coach and former player who is currently the manager of Boluspor.

References

1970 births
Living people
Turkish footballers
Turkish football managers
Manisaspor managers
Boluspor managers

Denizlispor managers
Association footballers not categorized by position